1,3,5,7-Cyclooctatetraene (COT) is an unsaturated derivative of cyclooctane, with the formula C8H8.  It is also known as [8]annulene. This polyunsaturated hydrocarbon is a colorless to light yellow flammable liquid at room temperature.  Because of its stoichiometric relationship to benzene, COT has been the subject of much research and some controversy.

Unlike benzene, C6H6, cyclooctatetraene, C8H8, is not aromatic, although its dianion,  (cyclooctatetraenide), is. Its reactivity is characteristic of an ordinary polyene, i.e. it undergoes addition reactions. Benzene, by contrast, characteristically undergoes substitution reactions, not additions.

History
1,3,5,7-Cyclooctatetraene was initially synthesized by Richard Willstätter in Munich in 1905 using pseudopelletierine as the starting material and the Hofmann elimination as the key transformation:

Willstätter noted that the compound did not exhibit the expected aromaticity. Between 1939 and 1943, chemists throughout the US unsuccessfully attempted to synthesize COT. They rationalized their lack of success with the conclusion that Willstätter had not actually synthesized the compound but instead its isomer, styrene. Willstätter responded to these reviews in his autobiography, where he noted that the American chemists were 'untroubled' by the reduction of his cyclooctatetraene to cyclooctane (a reaction impossible for styrene). During World War 2, Walter Reppe at BASF Ludwigshafen developed a simple, one-step synthesis of cyclooctatetraene from acetylene, providing material identical to that prepared by Willstätter. Any remaining doubts on the accuracy of Willstätter's original synthesis were resolved when Arthur C. Cope and co-workers at MIT reported, in 1947, a complete repetition of the Willstätter synthesis, step by step, using the originally reported techniques. They obtained the same cyclooctatetraene, and they subsequently reported modern spectral characterization of many of the intermediate products, again confirming the accuracy of Willstätter's original work. However, the freezing temperature of the product was different from pure COT, and the authors interpreted it as contamination with about 30% of styrene.

Structure and bonding

Early studies demonstrated that COT did not display the chemistry of an aromatic compound. 
Then, early electron diffraction experiments concluded that the C-C bond distances were identical.  
However, X-ray diffraction data from H. S. Kaufman demonstrated cyclooctatetraene to adopt several conformations and to contain two distinct C–C bond distances.  
This result indicated that COT is an annulene with fixed alternating single and double C-C bonds.

In its normal state, cyclooctatetraene is non-planar and adopts a tub conformation with angles C=C−C = 126.1° and C=C−H = 117.6°. The point group of cyclooctatetraene is D2d.

In its planar transition state, the D4h transitional state is more stable than the D8h transitional state due to the Jahn–Teller effect.

Synthesis
Richard Willstätter's original synthesis (4 consecutive elimination reactions on a cyclooctane framework) gives relatively low yields.  Reppe's synthesis of cyclooctatetraene, which involves treating acetylene at high pressure with a warm mixture of nickel cyanide and calcium carbide, was much better, with chemical yields near 90%:

COT can also be prepared by photolysis of barrelene, one of its structural isomers, the reaction proceeding via another isolable isomer, semibullvalene. COT derivatives can also be synthesised by way of semibullvalene intermediates. In the sequence illustrated below, octaethylcyclooctatetraene (C8Et8) is formed by thermal isomerisation of octaethylsemibullvalene, itself formed by copper(I) bromide mediated cyclodimerisation of 1,2,3,4-tetraethyl-1,4-dilithio-1,3-butadiene.

Because COT is unstable and easily forms explosive organic peroxides, a small amount of hydroquinone is usually added to commercially available material. Testing for peroxides is advised when using a previously opened bottle; white crystals around the neck of the bottle may be composed of the peroxide, which may explode when mechanically disturbed.

Natural occurrence
Cyclooctatetraene has been isolated from certain fungi.

Reactions
The π bonds in COT react as usual for olefins, rather than as aromatic ring systems. Mono- and polyepoxides can be generated by reaction of COT with peroxy acids or with dimethyldioxirane. Various other addition reactions are also known. Furthermore, polyacetylene can be synthesized via the ring-opening polymerization of cyclooctatetraene. COT itself—and also analogs with side-chains—have been used as metal ligands and in sandwich compounds.

Cyclooctatetraene also undergoes rearrangement reactions to form aromatic ring systems. For instance, oxidation with aqueous mercury(II) sulfate forms phenylacetaldehyde and photochemical rearrangement of its monoepoxide forms benzofuran.

Cyclooctatetraenide as a ligand and ligand precursor

COT readily reacts with potassium metal to form the salt K2COT, which contains the dianion .  The dianion is planar, octagonal, and aromatic with a Hückel electron count of 10.

Cyclooctatetraene forms organometallic complexes with some metals, including yttrium, lanthanides, and actinides.   The sandwich compound uranocene (U(COT)2) features two ῃ8-COT ligands.  In bis(cyclooctatetraene)iron (Fe(COT)2) one COT is ῃ6 and the other is ῃ4.  (Cyclooctatetraene)iron tricarbonyl features ῃ4-COT.  The room-temperature 1H NMR spectra of these iron complexes are singlets, indicative of fluxionality.

Cyclooctatetraene is chlorinated to give a [4.2.0]-bicyclic compound, which reacts further with dimethyl acetylenedicarboxylate in a Diels-Alder reaction (DA).  Retro-DA at 200 °C releases cis-dichlorocyclobutene. This compound reacts with diiron nonacarbonyl to give cyclobutadieneiron tricarbonyl.

See also
 Barrelene, structural isomer of cyclooctatetraene
 Benzene
 Cyclobutadiene
 Heptafulvene, structural isomer of cyclooctatetraene
 Pentalene
 Semibullvalene

References

Annulenes
Molecular electronics
Antiaromatic compounds
Eight-membered rings
Substances discovered in the 1900s